In baseball, a slider is a breaking ball pitch that tails laterally and down through the batter's  hitting zone. It is thrown at a speed that is lower than a fastball, but higher than the pitcher's curveball.

The break on the pitch is shorter than that of the curveball, and the release technique is 'between' those of a curveball and a fastball. The slider is similar to the cutter, a fastball pitch, but is more of a breaking ball than the cutter. The slider is also known as a yakker or a snapper.

Slider continuum
Depending on velocity, a pitch can fall anywhere on the continuum from "fastball" to "slider":
 fastball » cut fastball » hard slider » slider » slurve
 cut fastball:  slower than fastball
 hard slider:  slower than fastball
 slider:  slower than fastball

The difference between a slider and curveball is that the curveball delivery includes a downward yank on the ball as it is released in addition to the lateral spin applied by the slider grip. The slider is released off the index finger, while the curveball is released off the middle finger. If the pitcher is snapping his wrist as he throws, and the movement is more downward than sideways, then he is probably throwing a curveball or slurve, and not a true "slider". 

It is important when throwing a slider, or any breaking pitch in baseball, not to come "around" the baseball. When the pitcher "comes around" the ball, the pitcher puts extra tension on his pitching arm to throw that pitch. A slider is thrown with a regular arm motion, just like a fastball, and, ideally, the slider's velocity is only slightly lower than the pitcher's fastball. Thus, an effective slider can initially look like a fastball to the hitter. Slider movement is a direct result of the fingertip pressure and grip. The pitcher may visualize throwing his fingers at the catcher in order to improve follow through and finish the pitching motion.

Notable slider pitchers
A Hall of Fame pitcher famous for his slider was lefty Steve Carlton . Right-handed pitcher David Cone was famous for his slider, which he was able to use many different ways, as was Bob Gibson of the Cardinals. To right-handed batters, Cone would throw it to hook sharply outside the strike zone, getting hitters to chase and miss it. He threw the pitch from various arm angles to further confuse the hitter. Cone's slider was also a strikeout pitch to left-handed hitters, throwing it to curve back over the outside corner and catch the hitter looking. Hall of Fame reliever Dennis Eckersley had an effective slider, but when he tried to strike out Kirk Gibson with a backdoor slider in the first game of the 1988 World Series, Gibson was sitting on that exact pitch and hit a game-winning home run. Joe Carter ended the 1993 World Series with a home run on a slider thrown by Mitch Williams. John Smoltz rode his remarkable slider to a Hall of Fame career; it would come in looking like a fastball over the plate, then break sharply out of the strike zone. Brad Lidge featured a slider in his perfect season as a closer in 2008, and used the pitch to strike out the final batter of the 2008 World Series for the Philadelphia Phillies. Other top pitchers to throw a slider included Hall of Famer Rollie Fingers, who used the pitch to win a Cy Young Award in 1981, and Seattle Mariners and Arizona Diamondbacks starter Randy Johnson, whose slider's lateral movement eventually spawned its own nickname, "Mr. Snappy".  At times, Johnson's slider was faster than most pitchers' fastballs. Mike Jackson, who tied Paul Assenmacher with the most games pitched in the 1990s (644), also threw a slider. Ron Guidry threw a slider, having learned the pitch from teammate and fellow lefty Sparky Lyle.

Armando Galarraga threw sliders 38.9% of the time in 2008, more than any other starting pitcher in the majors, and Ryan Dempster threw them 32.9% of the time, more than any other NL starting pitcher. In 2008 CC Sabathia had the most effective slider, among major league starting pitchers. Zack Greinke won the AL Cy Young award in 2009 in large part because of his slider, one of the better pitches in all of baseball. In 2011, Clayton Kershaw won the Pitching Triple Crown by allowing only a .117 average against his slider. Lefty Chris Sale became known for a hard-breaking slider that consistently results in swings-and-misses by right-handed batters despite the pitch often finishing near the hitter's back foot.

History
The innovator of the slider is debated, but some credit Chief Bender as the first to use the pitch. Bender used his slider to help him pitch a no-hitter and win 212 games in his career. Bender was the first pitcher to win six World Series games.

George Blaeholder was credited with using it with the St. Louis Browns in the 1920s, when the slider was known as a "nickel curve," and George Uhle and Harry O'Neill have also been given credit for developing the pitch.

More recently, New York Yankee pitcher Ron Guidry mastered the pitch to great effect in 1978 when he went 25–3 and won the Cy Young Award. It is also the name of the Cleveland Guardians mascot who was inducted into the Mascot Hall of Fame.

References

Baseball pitches